Sam Rosen (born Samuel Rosenblum, August 12, 1947) is an American sportscaster and Hockey Hall of Famer, best known as the primary play-by-play announcer for the National Hockey League's New York Rangers games on MSG.  On June 8, 2008, Rosen was inducted into the National Jewish Sports Hall of Fame.  On November 14, 2016, Rosen was enshrined as the Foster Hewitt Memorial Award winner for outstanding contributions as a broadcaster by the Hockey Hall of Fame. Rosen is currently the longest-tenured active broadcaster in the NHL.

Rosen's current responsibilities include Rangers telecasts and Sunday NFL games for Fox. He is paired with Joe Micheletti on Rangers broadcasts, and Charles Davis, among others, on national Fox broadcasts.

Early history
Rosen was born Samuel Rosenblum in Ulm, Germany, to Polish parents Louis Rosenblum (1915–1987) and the former Gitel Reiner (1915–2006) of Jewish descent just after World War II. His mother was born in Chełm, Poland. The Rosenblum family moved to Brooklyn, New York, when Rosen was 2 years old. As a New York Yankees fan, Rosen became a fan of their broadcaster Mel Allen.  Rosen attended Stuyvesant High School and the City College of New York. At both schools, Rosen played catcher and was the captain of the baseball team. Rosen also played intramural basketball, and was on the track team in high school. Rosen grew up with an older brother, Stephen.

Broadcasting career

New York Rangers
From childhood on, Rosen attended numerous New York Rangers games and taped himself doing play by play. Rosen was mentored by veteran Rangers broadcaster Jim Gordon. From 1982 to 1984, he was the studio host on Ranger broadcasts, but was promoted to play-by-play in 1984, succeeding Gordon. Rosen's first partner was ex-Bruin and Ranger star Phil Esposito. Starting in 1986–87, when Esposito left to become Rangers general manager, Rosen was paired with former Rangers goaltender John Davidson (nicknamed J.D.). The team would last 20 years together until Davidson left for a management position with the St. Louis Blues and later with the Columbus Blue Jackets. Together, Sam and J.D. would be the longest-serving NHL broadcast team. Davidson would eventually return to take over duties as President of the Rangers in May 2019.

Beginning with the 2006–07 NHL season, Rosen partnered with Joe Micheletti, who was New York Islanders TV color analyst with former Rangers radio announcer Howie Rose on Fox Sports Net New York.

Rosen's most famous call comes every time the Rangers score a goal on the power play. The call is simply the name of the player, followed by, "It's a power play goal!", but Rosen uses a unique inflection which has been widely popular among Rangers fans and a staple of any Rangers broadcast.

However, his two most memorable calls came during the Rangers run to the first Stanley Cup in 54 years. First, he called Stéphane Matteau's double overtime goal in Game 7 of the Eastern Conference Finals with: 

Then when the Rangers won the Stanley Cup,highest-rated game in MSG Network history: 

Rosen was recognized before the Rangers-Islanders game on March 21, 2014, for thirty years of service with the MSG Network. They then did a special called "This One Will Last a Lifetime: 30 Years of Sam Rosen", which was announced at intermission as a surprise to Rosen by longtime partner and friend John Davidson.

Rosen has been told by the Rangers he can continue his position as long as he wishes. He has asked his family to inform him if they feel he is losing his edge due to age but is encouraged that Los Angeles Dodgers broadcaster Vin Scully was still considered a top broadcaster when he retired at age 88.

Other broadcasting areas
While still in college Rosen worked in the news department at WINS.

Prior to taking the Rangers play-by-play job in 1984, Rosen also served as a studio host for New York Knicks basketball telecasts on MSG. By 1975, he was a full-time sportscaster for United Press International's 1000-station radio network ("UPI Audio") and was appointed its Sports Director in 1979. He not only worked a daily morning shift beginning with a 5:45 AM sportscast, but also assigned coverage by UPI's stringers at games in every city with a major league sports franchise, and supervised two junior sportscasters. The first hire he had a hand in was of a 20-year old with no previous full-time professional experience, named Keith Olbermann.

While at UPI, Rosen traveled to and covered most major sporting events, from the Super Bowl to the World Series. He and Olbermann covered the 1980 Winter Olympics for UPI, and between them reported all the breaking news coverage and produced a half-hour special report, when Yankees catcher and captain Thurman Munson was killed in a plane crash in August, 1979. Even though the UPI position was a full-time responsibility, while he held it Rosen continued his other part-time positions: back-up voice of the Rangers and Knicks on radio and television, Cosmos soccer play-by-play announcer and weekend news anchor on WNEW-AM radio, and spot television boxing assignments for ESPN and USA Network. Olbermann claimed that when he worked for him Rosen held as many as 11 different jobs, while Rosen says he didn't think it was that many but admitted he worked so often that he could easily have forgotten some of them. He left UPI in 1981 when his ESPN workload and compensation became a living wage by itself.

Rosen was employed by ESPN from 1979 to 1988, calling a variety of sports for the network including hockey, college football, boxing, table tennis, Australian rules football, college baseball, collegiate wrestling and NASL soccer.

He handled play-by-play for NHL Radio, a partnership between the NHL and Westwood One. He has called the Stanley Cup playoffs on the radio for many years, as well as the 2002 and 2006 Winter Olympic Men's Hockey Tournaments.

Rosen has also been a play-by-play announcer for NFL on Fox since 1996. Rosen also called preseason NFL games for the Chicago Bears from 2009 to 2017, when he was replaced by Adam Amin, and previously did this for the New York Giants for several seasons. Rosen's broadcasting partners have included Heath Evans, Kirk Morrison, Ron Pitts, Ray Bentley, Jerry Glanville, Tim Green, Brady Quinn, Matt Millen, Bill Maas, Brian Billick, Tim Ryan, Ronde Barber, Chad Pennington, Daryl Johnston, Cris Carter, John Lynch and Charles Davis.

Rosen was also the lead boxing announcer for the MSG Network until 1993. In 1989, he won the Sam Taub Award for excellence in boxing broadcasting journalism.

Rosen has also worked for Versus (now the NBC Sports Network) calling games in the first round of the Stanley Cup Playoffs.

Rosen was also a radio play-by-play announcer for the New York Cosmos.  His call "It's a Cosmos Goal" predated and could be considered as the basis for his trademark power play call.

References

External links
Sam Rosen Official Bio
Sam Rosen's Blog

1947 births
Living people
American people of German-Jewish descent
Association football commentators
Boxing commentators
Chicago Bears announcers
College baseball announcers in the United States
College football announcers
Foster Hewitt Memorial Award winners
German emigrants to the United States
Jewish American sportspeople
National Basketball Association broadcasters
National Football League announcers
National Hockey League broadcasters
North American Soccer League (1968–1984) commentators
New York Knicks announcers
New York Rangers announcers
NFL Europe broadcasters
Olympic Games broadcasters
People from New City, New York
Sportspeople from Brooklyn
21st-century American Jews